Augusto Sisson (15 November 1894 – 26 March 1982) was a Brazilian footballer. He played in three matches for the Brazil national football team in 1920. He was also part of Brazil's squad for the 1920 South American Championship.

References

External links
 

1894 births
1982 deaths
Brazilian footballers
Brazil international footballers
Place of birth missing
Association football midfielders
Grêmio Foot-Ball Porto Alegrense players
CR Flamengo footballers